Sir Archibald Duncan Wilson  (12 August 1911 – 20 September 1983) was a British diplomat and Master of Corpus Christi College, Cambridge.

Career
Wilson was born on 12 August 1911 in Winchester to Archibald Edward Wilson, German teacher at Winchester College, and Ethel Wilson, daughter of banker and financier Felix Schuster. He was educated at Sandroyd School then Winchester College and Balliol College, Oxford, where he studied Classics.

After his studies in Oxford he applied for the Diplomatic Service but due to a back ailment was not successful. He then spent a year teaching in Westminster School and then joined the British Museum as assistant keeper in 1937.

During the war the opportunity arose to join the Foreign Office; after the war, he served in Berlin for the Allied Control Commission for Germany.

He then specialized in Communist affairs and held the following positions:
Charge d'affaires in Peking 1957–59
Ambassador to Yugoslavia 1964–1968
Ambassador to the USSR 1968–1971

He retired from the diplomatic service in 1971 and was appointed Master of Corpus Christi College, Cambridge. While at Corpus he was also Chairman of the Appeal Committee of Cambridge University and was instrumental in the procurement of a new building to house the Faculty of Music. He retired from the Mastership in 1980 and was succeeded by Michael McCrum.

He died on 20 September 1983, aged 72.

Publications
Wilson wrote several books including:
Life and Times of Vuk Stefanović Karadžić (1970)
Tito's Yugoslavia (1979)
Leonard Woolf: A political biography, ed. Powell, (1978),

Family
Wilson's youngest sister was the philosopher Mary Warnock. Another younger sister, Grizel, married his Balliol friend, the historian and civil servant Michael Balfour. Wilson married Elizabeth Fleming in 1937 and had three children, Elizabeth, Catherine (born 1940) and David (1941–1975). His daughter Elizabeth married Romanian pianist Radu Lupu.  He was a good friend of the composer Benjamin Britten and the cellist Mstislav Rostropovich.

Notes

References
WILSON, Sir (Archibald) Duncan, Who Was Who, A & C Black, 1920–2008; online edn, Oxford University Press, Dec 2012
Sir Duncan Wilson (obituary), The Times, London, 22 September 1983

 
 

1911 births
1983 deaths
Ambassadors of the United Kingdom to Yugoslavia
Ambassadors of the United Kingdom to the Soviet Union
Knights Grand Cross of the Order of St Michael and St George
Masters of Corpus Christi College, Cambridge
People educated at Sandroyd School
People educated at Winchester College
Alumni of Balliol College, Oxford